The 2005–06 Men's EuroFloorball Cup Finals took place in Ostrava, Czech Republic from 4 to 8 January 2006. Warberg IC won the EuroFloorball Cup after defeating SSV Helsinki 7–6 after penalty shots.

The tournament was known as the 2005–06 Men's European Cup, but due to name implications, is now known as the 2005–06 Men's EuroFloorball Cup.

Championship results

Preliminary round

Conference A

Conference B

Playoffs

Semi-finals

Bronze-medal match

Championship Match

Placement round

7th-place match

5th-place match

Standings

See also
2005–06 Men's EuroFloorball Cup qualifying

External links
Standings & Statistics

EuroFloorball Cup
2006 in floorball